Caesar Placing Cleopatra Back on the Throne of Egypt is an oil on canvas painting by Pietro da Cortona. No documents survive to precisely date it, though current art historical consensus is that it was 1637 (or 1643 according to its JOCONDE entry ). It was commissioned by Louis Phélypeaux, marquis de La Vrillière for his hôtel particulier in Paris - di Cortona also painted Faustulus Entrusting Romulus and Remus to Laarentia and Augustus and the Tiburtine Sibyl for him. The work was deposited in the Museum of Fine Arts of Lyon, where it was deposited in 1811.

Sources
http://www.culture.gouv.fr/public/mistral/joconde_fr?ACTION=CHERCHER&FIELD_1=REF&VALUE_1=000PE030361 

1630s paintings
1640s paintings
Paintings by Pietro da Cortona
Paintings of Julius Caesar and Cleopatra